Caddonlee is a farm in the village of Clovenfords in the Scottish Borders area of Scotland, by the Caddon Water, near Caddonfoot where Caddon Water meets the Tweed . The nearest town is Galashiels.  On the farm are traces of an auxiliary Roman fort allied to that main Roman outpost at Trimontium at Melrose

See also
List of places in the Scottish Borders
List of places in Scotland

External links

RCAHMS/Canmore site record for Caddonlee
Ancient Stone Circles and Standing Stones
Ancient finds / Donations to the Museum
GEOGRAPH Image: Dismantled railway at Caddonlee

Villages in the Scottish Borders